Just for a Thrill is the twenty-third studio album of country music artist Ronnie Milsap. It was released in 2004 under Image Records, his first for the label. The album consisted of fourteen recordings of pop and jazz standards.

The record peaked at number 11 on Top Jazz Albums, Milsap's first appearance on the chart. Allmusic gave the album four stars, commenting that "Milsap's voice is in great shape." The review cited the tracks, "Bewitched, Bothered and Bewildered,"  "Haunted Heart," "Ev'ry Time We Say Goodbye," "In the Wee Small Hours of the Morning," and "Since I Fell for You" as being "complemented" by Milsap's "vocals and piano."

Track listing
"I Don't Want Nobody to Have My Love But You" (Buddy Johnson) – 2:45  
"Teach Me Tonight" (Sammy Cahn, Gene De Paul) – 4:08  
"Cry"  (Churchill Kohlman) – 3:53  
"Make Believe Medley" – 3:24  
"Make Believe" (Oscar Hammerstein II)
"I'm Gonna Sit Right Down and Write Myself a Letter" (Fred E. Ahlert, Joe Young)
"Bewitched, Bothered and Bewildered" – (Lorenz Hart, Richard Rodgers) – 3:46  
"Haunted Heart" (Howard Dietz, Arthur Schwartz) – 2:54  
"But I Do" (Paul Gayten, Robert Guidry) – 4:04  
"Since I Fell for You" (Johnson) – 4:19  
"Ev'ry Time We Say Goodbye" (Cole Porter) – 4:04  
"But Not for Me" (George Gershwin, Ira Gershwin) – 2:21  
"In the Wee Small Hours of the Morning" (Bob Hilliard, David Mann) – 3:27  
"Just for a Thrill"  (Lil Hardin Armstrong, Don Raye) – 3:37  
"My Funny Valentine"  (Hart, Lor Hart, Rodgers) – 3:40  
"My Babe" (Willie Dixon) – 3:27

Cover versions
In 2013, the renowned Spanish actress and singer Natalia Dicenta released a version of the song "Just for a Thrill" on her album Colours.

Personnel
James Atkinson - french horn
Marilyn Baker - viola
Rick Baptist - trumpet
Wayne Bergeson - trumpet
Charlie Bisharat - violin
George Bohanon - trombone
Tom Boyd - oboe
Jamie Brantley - acoustic guitar
Vanessa Brown - percussion
Dennis Budimir - acoustic guitar
Becky Bunnell - violin
Pete Christlien - tenor saxophone
Gene Cipriano - baritone saxophone
Larry Corbett - cello
Joel Derouin - violin
Assa Drori - violin
Ernest Ehrhardt - cello
Charles Everett - violin
Dominick Farinacci - trumpet
Armen Garabedian - violin
Berj Garabedian - violin
Pamela Goldsmith - viola
Gary Grant - trumpet
Clayton Haslop - violin
Dan Higgins - soprano saxophone
David Hungate - bass guitar
Marilyn Johnson - french horn
Patricia Johnson - violin
Anne Karam - cello
Dan Kelly - french horn
Paul Leim - drums
Gayle Levant - harp
Charles Loper - trombone
Warren Luening - flugelhorn, trumpet
Bob Mann - electric guitar
Catherine Styron Marx - piano
Ronnie Milsap - Fender Rhodes, piano, electric piano, lead vocals
Jennifer Munday - violin
Richard "Dick" Nash - trombone
Dean Parks - electric guitar
James Ross - viola
Don Shelton - alto saxophone
Harry Shirinian - viola
Dan Smith - cello
Phillip Teele - trombone
Richard Todd - french horn
Mari Tsumura - violin
Miwako Watanabe - violin
George Young - tenor saxophone

Chart

References

2004 albums
Ronnie Milsap albums
Image Entertainment albums